René Cardona (October 8, 1905 – April 25, 1988) was a Mexican director, actor, producer, screenwriter, and film editor, who was prominent during as part of the Golden Age of Mexican cinema.

Biography 
René Cardona was born in Havana, Cuba, on October 8, 1905, and began medical school in Cuba, but due to the political problems of the island, he and his family moved to New York City in 1926, where he continued his studies. Economic circumstances experienced by his family caused him to leave his studies. He befriended famous actor Rodolfo Valentino and obtained work as an extra in several films, until 1929 when he produced, wrote, directed and starred in the first Spanish-language film made in Hollywood, Sombras habaneras (Havana Shadows). He also had the opportunity to work in various positions in the film industry such as second assistant, technical advisor and first assistant director, and learned film and lighting technique. In 1932, he moved to Mexico, where he debuted as an actor and met Julieta Zacarías, sister of the director Miguel Zacarías, and soon after married her. His wife's support would be central to his career in Mexican cinema, in films Mano a mano (1932) directed by Ramón Peón and Sobre las olas (1932) directed by Zacarías. At this early stage as an actor, Cardona participated in three key Mexican films Marihuana (1936), El baúl macabro (1936) and Allá en el Rancho Grande (1936), which officially inaugurate the golden age of Mexican cinema and made stars of its protagonists: Esther Fernández, Tito Guízar, and Cardona.

Film directing 
After the success of Allá en el Rancho Grande (1936), the following year Cardona decided to direct his first film in Mexico, Don Juan Tenorio, in which he also starred. Although it was not a success, it did not stop Cardona. He directed Allá en el Rancho Chico (1938) and La reina del río (1939), debuting two future stars: Blanca Estela Pavón in the first and Susana Guízar in the second. His 1939 El Cobardo starred Julián Soler.

Shortly after, he directed the stellar performances of Pedro Infante in Jesusita en Chihuahua (1942), and Germán Valdés "Tin Tan" in Hotel de verano (1944). In gratitude, both actors agreed to appear together only once in a Cardona film: También de dolor se canta (1952).

His career became so prolific that during 1937–1986, he directed more than one hundred films, in which he directed several of the biggest stars in Mexico. In the late fifties he made two films aimed at children, Pulgarcito (Tom Thumb) (1957) and Santa Claus (1959), which earned him several international awards. He directed many films in the 1960s which became cult classics, including Wrestling Women vs. the Aztec Mummy (1964), The Batwoman (aka La mujer murciélago) (1968) and the horror film Night of the Bloody Apes (1969).

In the seventies, he produced and directed three films that achieved international success: La isla de los hombres solos (1974), considered Cardona's best film and based on the novel by José León Sánchez, El pequeño Robin Hood (1975), and Supervivientes de los Andes (1976).

Cardona directed his last film in 1982.

Acting 
As an actor René also achieved prestige, was a founding member of the ANDA and twice nominated for an Ariel Award and acted in over 100 films, the most memorable are El secreto del sacerdote (1941), Caballería del imperio (1942), El peñón de las ánimas (1943), which marked the debut of María Félix, El abanico de Lady Windermere (1944), La barca de oro (1947), Soledad (1947) with Libertad Lamarque, Cartas marcadas (1948), with Pedro Infante and Marga López, La vorágine (1949) with Armando Calvo and Alicia Caro, Las tres perfectas casadas (1953) with Arturo de Córdova and Miroslava Stern among others, his career continued until shortly before his death and he even acted in a few films directed by his son, René Cardona Jr. such as La casa que arde de noche (1985).

Later years and death 
His last screen appearances were in the television series Rosa salvaje and the film El fiscal de hierro (1989). He was bestowed a life honor by the national film library of Mexico on 15 December 1986 and received from El Heraldo de México in recognition of his 52 years of film work in the same year. He died in Mexico City on April 25, 1988.

Awards

Selected filmography 

 Carne de Cabaret (1931)
 The Coward (1939)
 The Priest's Secret (1941)
 The Rock of Souls (1942)
 Jesusita in Chihuahua (1942)
 The Count of Monte Cristo (1942)
 Summer Hotel (1944)
 The Museum of Crime (1945)
 ¡Ay qué rechula es Puebla! (1946)
 The Associate (1946)
 Pompeyo el conquistador (1953)
 To the Four Winds (1955)
 The New World (1957)
 Santa Claus (1959)
 Juan Polainas (1960)
 Doctor of Doom (1962)
Wrestling Women vs. the Aztec Mummy (1964)
 Neutron Traps the Invisible Killers (1965)
The Batwoman (1968)
Night of the Bloody Apes (1969)
 The Incredible Professor Zovek (1972)
The Divine Caste (1973)
La isla de los hombres solos (1974)
El pequeño Robin Hood (1975)
Survive! (1976)

References 

 Varios (2000). Época de oro del cine mexicano de la A a la Z. En SOMOS. México: Editorial Televisa, S. A. de C.V.
 Luis Cortés Bargalló́, La lengua española y los medios de comunicación, Volumen 2, Siglo XXI, 1998, 9789682321092
 Cátedra Extraordinaria "José Martí", Cátedra "Benito Juárez", Relaciones México-Cuba, 1950-2006: historias y perspectivas, Volumen 4 de Serie Memorias, UNAM, 2007, 9789703242481
 Enciclopedia de México, E B P Latin America Group, Incorporated, 2005, 9781564090744

External links 
 
 

1905 births
1988 deaths
Mexican male film actors
Mexican film directors
Cuban emigrants to Mexico
People from Havana
Golden Age of Mexican cinema
20th-century Mexican male actors
20th-century Mexican screenwriters
20th-century Mexican male writers